Buliisa, also Bulisa, is a town in the Western Region of Uganda. It is the site of the headquarters of the Buliisa District. Neighborhoods within Buliisa Municipality include Wanseko and Kasenyi.

Location
The geographical coordinates of Buliisa Town are:02°07'18.0"N, 31°24'56.0"E (Latitude:2.121667; Longitude:31.415556).

Overview
Buliisa is on the northeastern shores of Lake Albert. The town gained prominence during the 2000s because of the large hydrocarbon deposits that have been discovered underground in the district and elsewhere in the Bunyoro sub-region.

Population
The Uganda Bureau of Statistics (UBOS), estimated the mid-year population of Buliisa at 7,600 in July 2015. In 2020, UBOS estimated the mid-year population of the town at 9,500. Of these, approximately 5,000 (52.6 percent) are males and approximately 4,500 (47.4 percent) are females. UBOS estimates that the town's population has grown at an average annual rate of 4.56 percent, between 2015 and 2020.

Infrastructure
The infrastructure already installed or in development in Buliisa Municipality and its neighborhood include: 1. Buliisa Health Center IV 2. Offices of Buliisa Town Council 3. Buliisa Resource Center 
4. Offices of Buliisa District Council 5. The northern Central Processing Facility (CPF) and 6. The northern crude oil intake pipeline from Buliisa to the Uganda Oil Refinery and the Uganda-Tanzania Crude Oil Pipeline in Kabaale, Hoima District.

The  Hoima–Butiaba–Wanseko Road terminates in Wanseko, a northern suburb of Buliisa Municipality.

See also
 List of cities and towns in Uganda

References

External links
Compensation Brings Temporary Excitement to Buliisa Locals

Populated places in Western Region, Uganda
Cities in the Great Rift Valley
Buliisa District
Bunyoro sub-region
Lake Albert (Africa)